The 2010 VIVA World Cup was the fourth VIVA World Cup, an international tournament for football open to non-FIFA-affiliated teams, played in Gozo. A record six men's teams competed in the tournament, including the two-time defending champions Padania.

Participating teams

Venues

Group stage

Group A

Group B

Knockout stage

Semi-finals

5th-place match

3rd-place match

Final

Goalscorers 

5 goals
  Haider Qaraman

External links 

2010
2010 in association football
20101
Viva World Cup
Football competitions in Gozo